The Oberliga Niedersachsen, sometimes referred to as Niedersachsenliga (Lower Saxony league), is the fifth tier of the German football league system and the highest league in the German state of Lower Saxony. Since 1994, the league was split into a western and an eastern group. In 2010, it returned to a single-division format. The Oberliga moved to a north-south split for one season in 2020. It is one of fourteen Oberligen in German football, the fifth tier of the German football league system.

Overview

1947–1963
The league was formed as Landesliga Niedersachsen in 1947, operating with four divisions in variable strength, all up with 42 clubs. The four regional divisions were named after the capital city of the district, being Hanover, Hildesheim, Braunschweig and Osnabrück. Additionally, some clubs from Lower Saxony also played in the Amateurliga Bremen, a trend that continues to a lesser degree even today. The state of Lower Saxony had only recently then been formed in the British occupation zone and the status of the Free Hanseatic City of Bremen as an independent German state had not been fully confirmed yet.

From the start, the Landesliga Niedersachsen was a feeder league to the Oberliga Nord which its champion had the option of promotion to. Promotion had to be achieved through a play-off with teams from the Amateurligen of Bremen, Hamburg and Schleswig-Holstein. As such, the league was the second tier of the northern German league system.

In 1949, the four Landesligen were disbanded in favor of the two new Amateuroberligen, the Amateuroberliga Niedersachsen-West and the Amateuroberliga Niedersachsen-Ost. The western division started with sixteen, the eastern with eighteen clubs. The majority of clubs previously playing in the Bremen leagues also returned to the Lower Saxony league system. Below the Amateuroberligen, eight Amateurligen were established. This system remained as such unchanged until 1964.

The two leagues continued to exchange clubs to balance out promotion and relegation but did not play out a Niedersachsen champion as such since promotion was decided between these two leagues and the other three northern German leagues. Especially the clubs from Hanover were frequently transferred between divisions.

After the first couple of seasons went with ever-changing club numbers in the two leagues, reaching a peak of twenty, by 1954 both leagues had arrived at sixteen clubs each, which they maintained for the most of the coming seasons.

1963–1974
In 1963, with the introduction of the Bundesliga, the disbanding of the Oberliga Nord and the formation of the Regionalliga Nord, the leagues fell to tier three, but initially remained unchanged otherwise. The champions of the Niedersachsen leagues continued to have to play-off for promotion, now to the Regionalliga, with the same opposition as before.

The year 1964 saw the creation of a single-division highest league for Niedersachsen. Eight clubs from the western group, seven from the eastern group, one team from the Regionalliga and two promoted teams made up the new Amateurliga Niedersachsen. Promotion however still had to be achieved through a promotion round with the other northern German champions.

Below the Amateurliga, four new Verbandsligen were established, North, South, East and West, with their champions directly promoted and four clubs relegated from the eighteen-team Amateurliga.

The late 1960s and early 1970s saw the oddity of fourth and fifth placed teams being promoted. The reasons for this were the fact that Lower Saxony, as the strongest association in northern Germany was permitted to send more than one team to the promotion round and the high finishes of reserve teams of the likes of Hannover 96, Arminia Hannover and Eintracht Braunschweig in the league, which were ineligible to enter the promotion rounds.

The league strength for most of these season stood at sixteen clubs.

1974–1994
After the 1973–74 season, the Regionalliga Nord was disbanded in favor of the 2nd Bundesliga Nord. The new Oberliga Nord was now introduced in northern Germany, as the third tier of the league system, below the 2nd Bundesliga. This meant for the Amateurliga a slip to tier four. The top three teams of the league were however promoted to the new Oberliga and the Amateurliga was renamed Landesliga Niedersachsen. The system for promotion from the Landesliga remained mostly unchanged and the league continued to operate on sixteen clubs.

For the first time, reserve teams were also eligible for promotion from the Niedersachsen league and Eintracht Braunschweig II became the first team to do so in 1975.

In 1979, the league changed its name once more, now becoming the Verbandsliga Niedersachsen, but remaining unchanged otherwise.

1994–2008
In 1994, the Regionalliga Nord was re-established, now as the third tier of the league system. The Oberliga Nord was in turn replaced by two parallel Oberligen, Niedersachsen/Bremen and Hamburg/Schleswig-Holstein. For the Verbandsliga Niedersachsen, this meant a further slip, now to tier five, and a split to two separate divisions again, but also, for the first time in its history, direct promotion for the league champions.

While the first and third placed team from the 1993-94 season gained entry to the new Regionalliga, the other twelve clubs of the top-fourteen were promoted to the Oberliga Niedersachsen/Bremen. Only the bottom five teams of the field of nineteen of that season actually remained in the Verbandsligen.

The first season of the new separated leagues saw a strong imbalance of clubs, West operated on sixteen, East on twenty-one teams. The year after, both run on a strength of sixteen.

The 1999–2000 season saw another league system change with the reduction of numbers of Regionalligen, this however had only one effect on the Verbandsligen, no direct promotion was available this year.

In 2004, it was decided to restore the Oberliga Nord in favor of the two separate Oberligen.

2008–2010
At the end of the 2007–08 season, the new 3. Liga was established and the Oberliga Nord disbanded, again. The four northern German states were then the only region without an Oberliga and the five Verbandsligen sat right below the Regionalliga Nord, parallel to the two NOFV-Oberligas. At the end of the 2007-08 season, the five winners of the northern Verbandsligen played with the sixth placed team from the Oberliga Nord for one last spot in the Regionalliga. In the following seasons, promotion for the Niedersachsenliga winners was only available through a decider between the two champions. These two teams competed for one promotion spot to the Regionalliga. The Niedersachsen-Liga however maintained their status as tier five leagues and accordingly was renamed Oberliga Niedersachsen.

2010 onwards
The 2009–10 season functioned as a qualifying stage for the new single-division Niedersachsenliga, which kick-off in 2010. While the Lower Saxony champion was promoted to the Regionalliga, as in the previous season, the other fifteen teams placed one to eight in the two leagues were directly qualify for the new league. The four teams placed ninth and tenth took part in a qualifying round with the four Bezirksoberliga champions. In two groups of four, the top-two of each group also qualified for the new league. The teams placed eleventh or lower in the Oberligen in 2009–10 were automatically  relegated.

The new single-division Niedersachsenliga consisted of 20 clubs in its first season and then 18 thereafter, also fluctuation due to relegation/promotion to and from the Regionalliga are possible.

At the end of the 2011–12 season, the top four clubs, being the Goslarer SC, BV Cloppenburg, VfB Oldenburg and BSV Schwarz-Weiß Rehden, were directly promoted to the Regionalliga Nord while the sixth placed club, SV Holthausen/Biene, unsuccessfully entered a promotion playoff with the runners-up from the Oberliga Hamburg and Schleswig-Holstein-Liga. Fifth placed VfL Osnabrück II was ineligible for promotion to the Regionalliga as it is the reserve side of a 3. Liga team.

Position of the Oberliga Niedersachsen in the league system

Winners of the Niedersachsenligen

Landesliga Niedersachsen

Due to irregularities in the previous season, Hannover 96 was also promoted in 1949.

Amateuroberligen Niedersachsen West and Ost

(C) denotes club won Lower Saxony championship play–off (played out since 1956–57).
In 1954, the runner–up VfB Oldenburg was promoted instead.
In 1959, the runner–up Eintracht Osnabrück was promoted instead.
In 1960, the runner–up VfB Oldenburg was promoted instead.
In 1961, the third placed Eintracht Nordhorn was promoted instead.
In 1964, the runner–up Göttingen 05 was promoted instead.

Amateurliga/Landesliga/Verbandsliga Niedersachsen

In 1967, the third placed TuS Haste was promoted instead.
In 1968, the fourth placed TuS Celle was promoted instead.
In 1969, the fourth placed Olympia Wilhelmshaven was also promoted.
In 1970, the fifth placed SV Meppen was promoted instead.
In 1972, the runner–up SV Meppen was also promoted.
In 1974, the top three teams were promoted to the new Oberliga Nord, SpVgg Bad Pyrmont and Union Salzgitter were therefore also promoted.
In 1975, the second and third placed Eintracht Nordhorn and Eintracht Braunschweig II were promoted instead.
In 1977, the second placed VfB Peine won a play–off for the Lower Saxony championship, neither team was promoted.
In 1978, the second placed VfB Peine won a play–off for the Lower Saxony championship, neither team was promoted.
In 1979, the third placed MTV Gifhorn was also promoted.
In 1981, the third placed TSV Havelse was promoted instead.
In 1982, the runner–up Olympia Wilhelmshaven was also promoted.
In 1983, the third placed Eintracht Braunschweig II was promoted instead.
In 1985, the second and third placed Eintracht Braunschweig II and Wolfenbüttler SV were promoted instead.
In 1986, the runner–up SpVgg Göttingen was also promoted.
In 1989, the third placed TuS Esens was promoted instead.
In 1990, the third placed Eintracht Nordhorn was also promoted.
In 1993, the runner–up Preußen 07 Hameln was promoted instead.
In 1994, the top fourteen clubs were all promoted.

Verbandsligen Niedersachsen West and Ost

Bold denotes club gained promotion.
(C) denotes club won Lower Saxony championship play–off.
In 1996, the runner-up SSV Vorsfelde was also promoted.
In 1997, the runner-up Rotenburger SV was also promoted.

Oberligen Niedersachsen West and Ost

Bold denotes club gained promotion.
(C) denotes club won Lower Saxony championship play–off.
 In 2010 both champions gained promotion as none of the champions from the Bremen-Liga, Hamburg-Liga and Schleswig-Holstein-Liga applied for a Regionalliga licence.

Oberliga Niedersachsen

Bold denotes club gained promotion.
 In 2012, VfB Oldenburg and BSV Schwarz–Weiß Rehden were also promoted.
 In 2021, there was no promotion after the season was curtailed during the COVID-19 pandemic in Germany. Teams were placed according to points per game.

League placings
The complete list of clubs and placings in the league since introduction of the single-division Oberliga (2010–2020, 2022–present); in 2021, placings were based on points per game in the overall table after the Oberliga split into two groups again:

 1 Eintracht Braunschweig II was withdrawn after the 2018–19 season.
 2 VfL Osnabrück II was withdrawn after the 2016–17 season and it folded.
 3 TuS Lingen declared insolvency in 2016 and withdrew from the league.
 4 TuS Heeslingen declared insolvency in 2013 and folded, with a new club, Heeslinger SC, being formed in its place.
 5 Eintracht Nordhorn and Kickers Emden declared insolvency during the 2011–12 season and were relegated.

Key

References

Sources 
 Deutschlands Fußball in Zahlen,  An annual publication with tables and results from the Bundesliga to Verbandsliga/Landesliga. DSFS.
 Kicker Almanach,  The yearbook on German football from Bundesliga to Oberliga, since 1937. Kicker Sports Magazine.
 Die Deutsche Liga-Chronik 1945-2005  History of German football from 1945 to 2005 in tables. DSFS. 2006.

External links 
 Das deutsche Fussball Archiv  Historic German league tables
 The Oberliga Niedersachsen at Fussball.de  
 The Lower Saxony Football Association (NFV) 

Niedersachsenliga
Oberliga (football)
Football competitions in Lower Saxony
1947 establishments in Germany